Chak No. 56/GB Jassuana is a village 10 km from Jaranwala on the Satiana Road in Faisalabad District, Punjab, Pakistan. The bus stop name is Diversion, which is located at a bridge where two canals cross each other. There are two primary schools for boys and one for girls. The village is home to professionals working in computer science, medicine, engineering and commerce. The village is situated on a lake where geese and fish can be obtained. The cricket and Kabaddi teams of the town win tournaments every year around the area.

Villages in Faisalabad District